Kyle Loza (born May 15, 1986) is an FMX (Freestyle Motocross) rider, tattoo artist and musician, residing in Rancho Santa Margarita, California. He is the founder and member of the group Riders 4 Christ and is a tattoo artist.

He and his wife Casey front an Orange County rock band called "Piranha Fever". Loza has been playing guitar since he was 8 years old as well as drums.  He also produces all of their music in their recording studio. Casey plays bass and writes lyrics.

Riding
Loza won back-to-back-to-back gold for Moto X Best Trick in the X Games XIII in 2007 with a move he invented called The Volt, and X Games XIV in 2008, with another of his invented moves - Electric Doom. He was the first person to have won three X Games Moto X Best Trick gold medals in a row. He also won silver at the inaugural X Games Mexico in September 2007. He also won a gold medal at X Games 15 in which the judges went with Loza's Electric Doom to Kiss of Death but some Internet fans thought another competitors "innovation" should have taken gold. He now holds the record for winning three consecutive gold medals for Best Moto X Trick and is the only one in the history of the X Games to achieve this. To win his third gold medal he showed the crowd an improved version of the trick which led him to gold in 2008 on the X Games XIV. The trick is called "Electric Doom". Loza chose to sit out of last Moto X best trick due to a nagging wrist injury. X Games 17 Kyle had a bloody incident occur during practice on the morning of, he was rushed to the ER and had his thumb sewn back on. His wife commented on the accident, saying, "Kyle was sitting in the ER rushing the DR to sew him up so he could make it down to LA in time for practice...This injury has stirred something in Kyle I've never seen before, he is more driven to destroy every contest in his path that he's been pushing himself further than humanly possible". Apparently the couple invested in large amounts of superglue so that Loza could practice a month sooner than his doctor would allow.

Riders 4 Christ
Riders 4 Christ are a group of Evangelical Christian freestyle motocross riders. The team is made up of Greg Hartman, Tori Norris, Kenny Bartram, Kyle Loza, Nate Adams, Mike Metzger, Ronnie Faisst, Destin Cantrell, Jimmie McGuire and Bryan Dowdy. Their vision is to push their sport while showing that their faith is a truly important part of their lives.

Personal life
Loza is married to Casey Patridge, and together they have two sons. Casey has a daughter.

References

External links
Kyle Loza at ESPN.com
KyleLoza.com
Riders4Christ.com
Riders4Christ Facebook page

1986 births
Living people
X Games athletes
Freestyle motocross riders
People from Rancho Santa Margarita, California
American evangelists